Yasoda is a genus of butterflies in the family Lycaenidae. The species in this genus are found in the Indomalayan realm.

Species
Yasoda tripunctata (Hewitson, 1863) - branded yamfly
Yasoda pita (Horsfield, [1829])
Yasoda androconifera Fruhstorfer, 1912
Yasoda robinsoni Holloway, 1986
Yasoda pitane de Nicéville, 1893

External links
"Yasoda Doherty, 1889" at Markku Savela's Lepidoptera and Some Other Life Forms

 
Loxurini
Lycaenidae genera
Taxa named by William Doherty